Bhilai Airport is located at Bhilai, in the state of Chhattisgarh, India. The airport is owned by the Steel Authority of India

References 

Airports in Chhattisgarh
Transport in Bhilai
Airports with year of establishment missing